Néstor Zanatta (born 25 November 1973) was an Argentine footballer.

He has played for clubs in Argentina, Chile, Ecuador and Venezuela.

References
 

1973 births
Living people
Argentine footballers
Argentine expatriate footballers
Gimnasia y Tiro footballers
Deportivo Mandiyú footballers
Newell's Old Boys footballers
Unión La Calera footballers
Ñublense footballers
Rangers de Talca footballers
C.D. Arturo Fernández Vial footballers
Deportes Concepción (Chile) footballers
Expatriate footballers in Chile
Expatriate footballers in Ecuador
Expatriate footballers in Venezuela
Chilean Primera División players
Primera B de Chile players
Association football midfielders
Lota Schwager footballers